Drachma is a genus of moths of the family Crambidae. It contains only one species, Drachma proctocomys, which is found in Cameroon.

References

Pyraustinae
Crambidae
Moths described in 1913
 Lepidoptera of Cameroon